= Selective percutaneous myofascial lengthening =

Surgical procedure

- Other names: SPML

Selective percutaneous myofascial lengthening is a type of minimally invasive surgery utilized to relieve tension from muscle spasticity. It has been used to treat children who have cerebral palsy.
